Chanki is a village in West Champaran district in the Indian state of Bihar.

Demographics
As of 2011 India census, Chanki had a population of 2413 in 488 households. Males constitute 52.63% of the population and females 47.36%. Chanki has an average literacy rate of 55.9%, lower than the national average of 74%: male literacy is 62.26%, and female literacy is 37.73%. In Chanki, 20.47% of the population is under 6 years of age.

References

Villages in West Champaran district